The 39th Metro Manila Film Festival (MMFF), presented by the Metropolitan Manila Development Authority (MMDA), was held from 25 December 2013 to the first week of January 2014. During the festival, no foreign films are shown in Philippine theaters (except IMAX theaters) in order to showcase locally produced films. For this year, eight film entries were chosen by the MMDA to be showcased in the festival. Contrary to previous years, the Enteng Kabisote, Panday, and Shake, Rattle & Roll films were not presented for this year's festival.

10,000 Hours won the most awards with fourteen, including Best Actor for Robin Padilla, Best Director for Joyce Bernal, and Best Picture. Other winners included My Little Bossings with four awards, Girl, Boy, Bakla, Tomboy with three, and Pagpag: Siyam na Buhay and Boy Golden with one.

Background 
The 38th Metro Manila Film Festival held in 2012 became the highest earning MMFF to date with 767 million pesos, 21% higher than that of 2011. On a speech by Chairman Francis Tolentino of Metropolitan Manila Development Authority or MMDA, announcement was held on the creation of a new category, "Animation" under the "New Wave" will be launched on this year. He stated, "...With the growing talent of pool animators both locally and abroad, it is high time that we recognize and showcase their potential to a broader audience...". The Animahenasyon: Philippine Animation Festival will feature 5 animated films acts as Prelude to be shown in theater 1 week ahead of the mainstream films. In line with the move, the MMFF has partnered with the Animation Council of the Philippines, the country's lead organization in the promotion of the animation industry development. But in the press conference held on the announcement of 8 official entries, Chairman Tolentino announced that the animation category will have to be postponed until the next festival. He also announced the creation of the MMFF Review Committee which will assess and improve the rules, regulations, and implementing programs of the film festival.

Entries

Official entries 
On 18 June 2013, the eight official entries were announced by MMDA Chairman Francis Tolentino namely 10,000 Hours, Girl, Boy, Bakla, Tomboy, Kimmy Dora: Ang Kiyemeng Prequel, Pagpag, Pedro Calungsod: Batang Martir, My Super Kap, and My Little Bossings. Due to technical difficulties and other external factors, some entries dropped out of the competition, in which the MMDA committee pick from other entries, which failed to be shortlisted, to replace the withdrawn entry.

New Wave entries 
These films were screened from 18 to 24 December as a prelude to the MMFF.

Student shorts
 Gapos - JMK De Guzman, Colegio de San Juan de Letran
 Hintayin Mo sa Seq. 24 - Jezreel Reyes and Jose Silvestre, Far Eastern University
 #No Filter - Luigi Lupe Rosario, Mapúa Institute of Technology

Animated films
 Gayuma ni Maria - Gabriel Villalon
 Kaleh and Mbaki - Dennis Sebastian
 Ang Lalong ni Kulakog -  Omar Aguilar
 Mamang Pulis - Hannah Espia
 Origin of Mang Jose - Apollo Anonuevo

Awards 

On 27 December 2013, the Metro Manila Film Festival Awards Night was held at Meralco Theater in Ortigas Center, Pasig. Winners are listed first and highlighted in boldface. The awards night was aired on TV5.

Major awards

{| class=wikitable style="width=150%"
|-
! style="background:#EEDD82;" ! style="width=50%" | Best Picture
! style="background:#EEDD82;" ! style="width=50%" | Best Director
|-
| valign="top" |
10,000 Hours – Philippine Film Studios, Inc. and Viva FilmsGirl, Boy, Bakla, Tomboy – Viva Films and Star Cinema 
My Little Bossings – OctoArts Films, M-Zet TV Productions, APT Entertainment, Inc., and K Productions 
Boy Golden – Scenema Concept International, Inc. and Viva Films
Kaleidoscope World – iACT Productions
Kimmy Dora: Ang Kiyemeng Prequel – Spring Films
Pagpag: Siyam na Buhay – ABS-CBN Film Productions, Inc. and Regal Entertainment, Inc.
Pedro Calungsod: Batang Martir – H.P.I. Synergy Group
| valign="top" |Joyce E. Bernal – 10,000 Hours
Chito S. Roño – Boy Golden
Wenn V. Deramas – Girl, Boy, Bakla, Tomboy
Marlon Rivera – My Little Bossings
Frasco Mortiz – Pagpag: Siyam na Buhay
|-
! style="background:#EEDD82;" ! style="width=50%" | Best Actor
! style="background:#EEDD82;" ! style="width=50%" | Best Actress
|-
| valign="top" |
Robin Padilla – 10,000 Hours as Gabriel Molino Alcaraz
Vice Ganda – Girl, Boy, Bakla, Tomboy as Girlie, Peter, Mark Jill, and Panying Jackstone
Jeorge Estregan – Boy Golden as Arturo "Boy Golden" Porcuna
Vic Sotto – My Little Bossings as Victor "Torky" Villanueva
Daniel Padilla – Pagpag: Siyam na Buhay as Cedric
Rocco Nacino – Pedro Calungsod: Batang Martir as Pedro Calungsod
| valign="top" |
Maricel Soriano – Girl, Boy, Bakla, Tomboy as Pia Jackstone
KC Concepcion – Boy Golden as Marla "Marla Dy" De Guzman
Eugene Domingo – Kimmy Dora: Ang Kiyemeng Prequel as Kimmy and Dora Go Dong Hae
Kathryn Bernardo – Pagpag: Siyam na Buhay as Leni
Bela Padilla – 10,000 Hours as Maya Limchauco
|-
! style="background:#EEDD82;" ! style="width=50%" | Best Supporting Actor
! style="background:#EEDD82;" ! style="width=50%" | Best Supporting Actress
|-
| valign="top" |Pen Medina – 10,000 Hours as Sebastian JagoBaron Geisler – Boy Golden as Datu Putla
Janus del Prado – Pagpag: Siyam na Buhay as Dencio
Christian Vasquez – Pedro Calungsod: Batang Martir as Diego Luis de San Vitores
Michael de Mesa – 10,000 Hours as Dir. Dante Cristobal
Cholo Barretto – 10,000 Hours as Benjo Alcaraz
| valign="top" |Aiza Seguerra – My Little Bossings as IceGloria Sevilla – Boy Golden as Aling Puring
Shaina Magdayao – Pagpag: Siyam na Buhay as Lucy
Carla Humphries – 10,000 Hours as Isabelle Manahan
Mylene Dizon – 10,000 Hours as Anna Alcaraz
|-
! style="background:#EEDD82;" ! style="width=50%" | Gatpuno Antonio J. Villegas Cultural Award
! style="background:#EEDD82;" ! style="width=50%" | Fernando Poe Jr. Memorial Award for Excellence
|-
| valign="top" |10,000 Hours| valign="top" |10,000 Hours|-
! style="background:#EEDD82;" ! style="width=50%" | Best Screenplay
! style="background:#EEDD82;" ! style="width=50%" | Best Original Story
|-
| valign="top" |10,000 Hours – Ryllah Epifania Berica and Keiko AquinoGirl, Boy, Bakla, Tomboy – Mel Mendoza del Rosario
Kimmy Dora: Ang Kiyemeng Prequel – Chris Martinez
My Little Bossings – Bibeth Orteza
| valign="top" |10,000 Hours – Neil Arce, Peter Serrano, Bela Padilla and Joyce BernalGirl, Boy, Bakla, Tomboy – Mel Mendoza del Rosario
My Little Bossings – Bibeth Orteza
Pagpag: Siyam na Buhay – Joel Mercado
|-
! style="background:#EEDD82;" ! style="width=50%" | Gender Sensitivity Award
! style="background:#EEDD82;" ! style="width=50%" | Best Cinematography
|-
| valign="top" |
 Girl, Boy, Bakla, Tomboy| valign="top" |10,000 Hours – Marissa Floirendo and Gilberto VistanBoy Golden – Carlo Mendoza
Girl, Boy, Bakla, Tomboy – Sherman So
My Little Bossings – Lee Briones Meily
|- 
! style="background:#EEDD82;" ! style="width=50%" | Best Editor
! style="background:#EEDD82;" ! style="width=50%" | Best Production Design
|-
| valign="top" |Marya Ignacio – 10,000 HoursMarya Ignacio – Girl, Boy, Bakla, Tomboy
Joyce Bernal – Kimmy Dora: Ang Kiyemeng Prequel
Jerrold Tarog – Pagpag: Siyam na Buhay
| valign="top" |10,000 Hours – Joey LunaBoy Golden – Fritz Silorio and Joel M. V. Bilbao
Girl, Boy, Bakla, Tomboy – Danilo Cristobas
Kimmy Dora: Ang Kiyemeng Prequel – Digo Ricio
Pedro Calungsod: Batang Martir – Art Nicdao
|-
! style="background:#EEDD82;" ! style="width=50%" | Best Visual Effects
! style="background:#EEDD82;" ! style="width=50%" | Best Make-up Artist
|-
| valign="top" |10,000 Hours – Central DigitalBoy Golden – Mothership, Inc.
Girl, Boy, Bakla, Tomboy – Dodge Ledesma
Kimmy Dora: Ang Kiyemeng Prequel – Optima Digital
Pagpag: Siyam na Buhay – Blackburst, Inc.
| valign="top" |Mountain Rock Productions and Leslie Lucero – Pagpag: Siyam na BuhayJuvan Bermil, Virginia Apolinario, and Benny Batoctoy – Boy Golden
Edna Perida – Girl, Boy, Bakla, Tomboy
Alex "Bo" Vicencio – 10,000 Hours
|-
! style="background:#EEDD82;" ! style="width=50%" | Best Original Theme Song
! style="background:#EEDD82;" ! style="width=50%" | Best Musical Scorer
|-
| valign="top" |"My Little Bossings" from My Little Bossings – Jan K. Ilacad"Pahamak" from Kimmy Dora: Ang Kiyemeng Prequel – Yeng Constantino
"Awit ni Pedro" from Pedro Calungsod: Batang Martir – Francis O. Villacorta and Tonton Africa
| valign="top" |Teresa Barrozo – 10,000 HoursVincent de Jesus – Girl, Boy, Bakla, Tomboy
Jessie Lasaten – My Little Bossings
Noel Espenida and Emlyn Oflindo Santos – Pedro Calungsod: Batang Martir
|-
! style="background:#EEDD82;" ! style="width=50%" | Best Sound Engineer
! style="background:#EEDD82;" ! style="width=50%" | Best Child Performer
|-
| valign="top" |Emmanuel Clemente – 10,000 HoursAlbert Michael Idioma and Adiss Tabong – My Little Bossings
Arnel Labayo – Pagpag: Siyam na Buhay
Albert Michael Idioma – Pedro Calungsod: Batang Martir
| valign="top" |
 Ryzza Mae Dizon – My Little Bossings|-
! style="background:#EEDD82;" ! style="width=50%" | Youth Choice Award
! style="background:#EEDD82;" ! style="width=50%" | Best Float
|-
| valign="top" |
 Pagpag: Siyam na Buhay| valign="top" |
 Boy Golden|}

New Wave category

 Full-Length Category 

 Other Awards 
 New Wave Student Short Film Special Jury Prize - #NoFilter New Wave Student Short Film Most Gender-Sensitive Film - Hintayin Mo sa Seq. 24 New Wave Animation Best Picture - Kaleh and Mbaki New Wave Animation Special Jury Prize - Ang Lalong ni Kulakog'''

Multiple awards

Mainstream

New Wave

Box Office gross 
The Metro Manila Development Authority was criticized for only releasing the official earnings of the Top 4 films.

References

External links 

Metro Manila Film Festival
MMFF
MMFF
MMFF
MMFF
2014 in Philippine cinema
Metro Manila Film Festival
Metro Manila Film Festival